The Rondo Theatre, in Bath, was established in 1989. The theatre is located in the former church hall of St. Saviours Church, Larkhall. The building was purchased in 1976 by Doreen and Wilf Williams, who subsequently founded The Rondo Trust for the Performing Arts. The building has been converted into a 105-seat theatre. The facility received extensive renovations and upgrades after the receipt of lottery grants in 1996 and 2003.

The theatre has an active programme of outreach activities, including a youth theatre, a scriptwriters group, theatre workshops, and afternoon tea concerts.

External links
The Rondo Theatre

Theatres in Bath, Somerset